Columbia Theatre may refer to:

 Columbia Theatre for the Performing Arts in Hammond, Louisiana, founded 1928 and still operating
 Columbia Theatre (Boston) (1891-ca.1957), a theatre in Boston, Massachusetts
 Columbia Theatre (New York City), a Manhattan burlesque venue from 1910 to 1928
 Central Theatre (New York City) or "Columbia Theatre" from 1934 to 1944, a Broadway theatre
 Columbia Theater (Washington, D.C.)

See also
Theater of Colombia, the theatre industry in the country of Colombia
Columbia (disambiguation)